California Proposition 19 (also known as the Regulate, Control & Tax Cannabis Act) was a ballot initiative on the November 2, 2010, statewide ballot. It was defeated, with 53.5% of California voters voting "No" and 46.5% voting "Yes." If passed, it would have legalized various marijuana-related activities, allowed local governments to regulate these activities, permitted local governments to impose and collect marijuana-related fees and taxes, and authorized various criminal and civil penalties.  In March 2010, it qualified to be on the November statewide ballot. The proposition required a simple majority in order to pass, and would have taken effect the day after the election. Yes on 19 was the official advocacy group for the initiative and California Public Safety Institute: No On Proposition 19 was the official opposition group.

A similar initiative, "The Tax, Regulate, and Control Cannabis Act of 2010" (California Cannabis Initiative, CCI) was filed first and received by the Attorney General's Office July 15, 2010, assigned 09-0022 that would have legalized cannabis for adults 21 and older and included provisions to decriminalize industrial hemp, retroactive expunging of criminal records and release of non violent cannabis prisoners.  It did not make it onto the ballot.

Supporters of Proposition 19 argued that it would help with California's budget shortfall, would cut off a source of funding to violent drug cartels, and would redirect law enforcement resources to more dangerous crimes, while opponents claimed that it contains gaps and flaws that may have serious unintended consequences on public safety, workplaces, and federal funding. Even if the proposition had passed, the sale of cannabis would have remained illegal under federal law via the Controlled Substances Act.

Proposition 19 was followed up by the Adult Use of Marijuana Act in 2016, which successfully passed a ballot initiative with 57% of the vote.

Effects of the bill 

According to the State of California's Legislative Analyst's Office, the law would have had the following effects.

Legalization of personal cannabis-related activities 

Except as permitted under Proposition 215 and SB 420 laws, persons age 21 and older may:
 possess up to 28.5 grams (1 oz) of cannabis for personal consumption.
 use cannabis in:
 a non-public place such as a residence
 a public establishment licensed for on site cannabis consumption.

Local government regulation of commercial production and sale 

Local governments may:

 Authorize the retail sale of up to 28.5 grams of cannabis per transaction to persons 21 and older.
 Regulate the location, size, hours of operation, and signs and displays of the establishments authorized to make these sales.
 Authorize larger amounts of cannabis for:
 personal possession and cultivation, or
 commercial cultivation, transportation, and sale.

Other permissions 

 Allows for the transportation of cannabis from a licensed premises in one city or county to a licensed premises in another city or county, without regard to local laws of intermediate localities to the contrary.
 Allows the collection of taxes to allow local governments to raise revenue or to offset any costs associated with cannabis regulation.

Maintenance and addition of criminal and civil penalties 

 Maintains existing laws against selling drugs to a minor and driving under the influence.
 Maintains an employer's right to address consumption of cannabis that affects an employee's job performance.
 Maintains existing laws against interstate or international transportation of cannabis.
 Every person 18 years of age or older who hires, employs, or uses a minor in transporting, carrying, selling, giving away cannabis, or knowingly sells or gives away cannabis to someone under the age of 14, shall be imprisoned in state prison for a period of three, five, or seven years.
 Every person 18 years of age or older who knowingly sells or gives away cannabis to someone older than the age of 14 but younger than 18, shall be imprisoned in the state prison for a period of three, four, or five years.
 Every person 21 years of age or older who knowingly sells or gives away cannabis to someone older than the age of 18 but younger than 21, shall be imprisoned in county jail for up to six months and fined up to $1,000 per offense.
 Any person who is licensed, permitted, or authorized to sell cannabis, who knowingly sells or gives away cannabis to someone under the age of 21, will be banned from owning, operating, or being employed by a licensed cannabis establishment for one year.

Fiscal impact 

The State Board of Equalization estimated that imposing a $50 per ounce levy on cannabis sales could generate $1.4 billion a year in new tax revenue, thus generating a large amount of revenue at a time when the state was experiencing financial pressure. This estimate came from the BOE's 2009 analysis of California Assembly Bill 390 based on a 2006 report entitled "Marijuana Production in the United States." These statistics were based on production estimates derived from marijuana eradication efforts from 2003 to 2005.
   
According to the States Legislative Analyst's office, passage of the proposition could have a significant fiscal impact, including:
  
 Significant savings to state and local governments; potentially up to several tens of millions of dollars annually due to reduction of individuals incarcerated, on probation, or on parole.
 Freeing up cells used to house marijuana offenders, which could be then used for other criminals, many of whom obtained early release because of a lack of jail space.
 Major reduction in state and local costs for enforcement of marijuana-related offenses and the handling of related criminal cases in the court system, providing the opportunity for funds to be used to enforce other existing criminal laws.
 Potential increase in the costs of substance abuse programs due to a projected increase in marijuana usage, possibly resulting in reduced spending on mandatory treatment for some criminal offenders, or in the redirection of these funds for other offenders.
 Potential reduction in both the costs and offsetting revenues of the state's medical marijuana program, as some adults over 21 would be less likely to participate in existing programs if obtaining marijuana were made less difficult.
 Providing the opportunity for significant additional tax revenue stream from businesses engaged in marijuana-related commerce.
 Reduction in fine collection under state law but a potential increase in local civil fines authorized by existing local laws (the cumulative effect on fines was indicated to be largely unknown).

In regard to potential savings from the reduction of incarcerated individuals, according to the California Department of Corrections and Rehabilitations, 1,639 state prison inmates were in prison for marijuana-related crimes at a cost of $85 million per year.

Arguments

Support 

Several arguments were used in support of passing Proposition 19. Supporters argued that legalizing marijuana in California would help alleviate the drug war in Mexico. Based on the theory espoused by the White House Office of National Drug Control Policy that up to 60% of Mexican drug cartels’ profits come from sales of marijuana, legalizing the drug in nearby California would drastically cut their funding. As a result, supporters of this argument believed that legalization would lead to a decrease in drug-related violent crime in Mexico.

Also cited were expected financial benefits of passing the measure. Economists lauded an analysis by Jeffrey Miron predicting $7.7 billion in projected savings on law enforcement expenses related to marijuana offenses, as well as expected revenues of up to $6.2 billion annually in taxes. These revenues were calculated based on marijuana sales taxes structured similarly to alcohol and cigarettes. In 2008, California police made 78,500 arrests related to marijuana.

Some civil rights groups lauded Proposition 19 as a way to reduce the disproportionate number of arrests of African-Americans and Latinos in California, many of which were related to marijuana possession. A study released by the New York-based Drug Policy Alliance found that despite having lower marijuana consumption rates than young whites, young Latinos and African Americans were arrested for marijuana possession at much higher rates than whites in the 25 largest California counties.

Supporters also argued that passing the measure would result in additional benefits including tourism and spinoff industries such as cafes and paraphernalia. Based on California's wine industry, proponents of this theory anticipated that legalizing marijuana in the state could generate up to $18 billion, including the creation of 60,000-110,000 jobs.

Some argued that legalization of marijuana could reduce drug-related violence, based on a study conducted by the International Centre for Science in Drug Policy. This study found that drug law enforcement contributes to increased levels of drug-related violence and suggests that "alternative models for drug control" may be necessary.

Opposition 

Opponents of Prop 19 argued that legalizing marijuana in California using the current proposition would have numerous negative consequences. They cited current Federal laws banning the cultivation, sale, and use of the drug, and claimed that it would create complications with drug trafficking and arrests as well as challenge Federal authority. Opponents also argued that Proposition 19 would complicate regulation across the state by allowing local jurisdictions the power to determine their own laws regarding cultivation and possession. Opponents claimed that this increased government activity would absorb much of the projected tax revenue.

Opponents of the measure also argued that it posed a public safety risk, based on research showing an association between marijuana use and voluntary treatment admissions for addiction, fatal drugged driving accidents, mental illness, and emergency room visits. Opponents also compared Prop 19 to current alcohol and tobacco regulation, arguing that the associated potential healthcare and criminal justice costs outweigh the tax revenue generated.

In response to supporters' claims regarding Prop 19's tax revenue generation, opponents claim the potential benefit is vastly overstated. Opponents also criticized the measure for failing to include specific accompanying tax proposals. Opponents also rejected the argument that revenue increases from the measure would improve the state budgetary deficit, dismissing it as a short-term fix.

Since California decriminalized the possession of small amounts of marijuana (under one ounce) in 1976, opponents reject the idea that legalization would free law enforcement to pursue violent crime in lieu of marijuana-related crime. A RAND Corporation study found that passage of the measure would likely do little to curtail the drug trade and cartel violence stemming from Latin America. Opponents also argued that passage would reflect softening attitudes in America toward drug consumption.

Supporters of medicinal marijuana use expressed concern that Prop 19 could burden growers with increased regulations. Also cited were potential confusion caused by double selling rules and a potential threat to existing protections for medical marijuana users.

History 

The first cannabis prohibition laws in California were passed in 1913. In the 1972 California November elections, a similar initiative to Proposition 19 which would have legalized cannabis was on the ballot, coincidentally also named Proposition 19. It failed to pass, with 66.5% voters voting "No" and 33.5% voting "Yes." In 1976 the passage of the Moscone Act changed small-scale possession of marijuana from a felony to a misdemeanor. Two decades later in 1996, Proposition 215, which legalized medical marijuana, passed with 56% of the vote. In 2003 the California Senate Bill SB 420 clarified some of Proposition 215 to address critics and issues that arose since it was passed.  In 2005, Oakland’s Measure Z, one of the first marijuana taxes, made marijuana possession one of the lowest law enforcement priorities. It was passed by 65% of the voters.  In July 2010, Oakland approved a cultivation ordinance.

Proposition 19's originator is Richard Lee, a marijuana legalization activist and medical marijuana provider based in Oakland.  Lee named political consultant Chris Lehane as the head of the campaign to pass the measure.<ref>{{cite news|title=Measure to legalize marijuana will be on California's Los Angeles Times|date=March 25, 2010|publisher=Tribune Company|url=http://articles.latimes.com/2010/mar/25/local/la-me-marijuana-initiative25-2010mar25|access-date=April 24, 2010|first=John|last=Hoeffel}}</ref> In order to qualify for the ballot, the initiative needed 433,971 valid petition signatures. The initiative proponents submitted 694,248 signatures, and it qualified through the random sample signature check.

 Stance on initiative 

In response to growing demand for a vote on the legal status of marijuana, California governor Arnold Schwarzenegger said in May 2009, "I think it's time for a debate. And I think that we ought to study very carefully what other countries are doing that have legalized marijuana and other drugs, what effect it had on those countries, and are they happy with that decision." However, in his signing statement for California SB 1449, which decriminalized possession of less than an ounce of marijuana from a misdemeanor to an infraction, Schwarzenegger said he opposed Proposition 19, calling it "deeply flawed" and claiming that its potential for generating tax revenue has been overstated.

 Support 

 Laura Wells, 2010 California Green Party gubernatorial candidate
 Dale Ogden, 2010 California Libertarian gubernatorial candidate
 Carlos Alverez, 2010 California Peace and Freedom Party gubernatorial candidate
 Gary Johnson, former two term Republican Governor of New Mexico, 2012 Libertarian Candidate for President
 Jesse Ventura, former Independent Governor of Minnesota
 Joycelyn Elders, former United States Surgeon General
 George Miller, current Democratic House Representative from California's 7th congressional district
 Barbara Lee, current Democratic House Representative from California's 9th congressional district
 Pete Stark, current Democratic House Representative from California's 13th congressional district
 John Dennis, 2010 Republican Congressional candidate for California's 8th congressional district
 Dan Hamburg, former Democratic House Representative from California's 1st congressional district
 Pete McCloskey, former Republican House Representative from California's 11th congressional district
 Don Perata, former Democratic President pro tempore of the California State Senate
 Mark Leno, current Democratic member of the California State Senate
 Tom Hayden, former Democratic member of the California State Senate
 Tom Ammiano, current Democratic member of the California State Assembly
 Hector De La Torre, current Democratic member of the California State Assembly
 Mary Hayashi, current Democratic member of the California State Assembly
 Jared Huffman, current Democratic member of the California State Assembly
 Nancy Skinner, current Democratic member of the California State Assembly
 Kerry Mazzoni, former Democratic member of the California State Assembly
 Vicente Fox, former President of Mexico
 Jorge Castañeda Gutman, former Secretary of Foreign Affairs of Mexico
 Tom Bates, current Mayor of Berkeley, California
 Jim Gray, former Superior Court judge of Orange County, California and former Libertarian Party senate candidate
 John A. Russo, current City Attorney of Oakland, California
 Paul Gallegos, current District Attorney of Humboldt County, California
 Jeffrey Schwartz, former Senior District Attorney and Prosecutor of Humboldt County, California
 Terence Hallinan, former District Attorney of San Francisco, California
 Mike Schmier, former District Attorney of Los Angeles, California and California Administrative Law Judge
 Norm Stamper, former Seattle, Washington police chief
 Joseph McNamara, former San Jose, California police chief
 Stephen Downing, former Los Angeles, California police chief
 David Doodridge, former Los Angeles, California narcotics detective
 Larry Bedard, former President of the American College of Emergency Physicians
 George Soros, businessman and stock investor
 Jeffrey Miron, Harvard University economist
 Sean Parker, an Internet technology businessman and co-founder of Napster and Facebook
 Dustin Moskovitz, co-founder of Facebook
 Paul Buchheit, creator of Gmail, co-founder of FriendFeed, and prolific Silicon Valley angel investor
 Peter B. Lewis, former CEO of Progressive Insurance
 Ed Rosenthal, cannabis activist and columnist
 Marc Emery, cannabis activist and former cannabis seed seller
 California NAACP
 League of United Latin American Citizens
 Oakland City Council
 Berkeley City Council
 West Hollywood City Council
 Humboldt County Board of Supervisors
 National Organization for the Reform of Marijuana Laws (NORML)
 California NORML
 Drug Policy Alliance
 Marijuana Policy Project
 California Courage Campaign
 Law Enforcement Against Prohibition
 Students for Sensible Drug Policy
 Interfaith Drug Policy Initiative
 Progressive Jewish Alliance
 American Civil Liberties Union (ACLU) of Northern California
 ACLU of Southern California
 ACLU of San Diego
 American Federation of Teachers
 National Black Police Association
 National Latino Officers Association
 United Food and Commercial Workers Union
 Communications Workers of America, Local 9415
 International Longshore and Warehouse Union, Northern California District Council
 Service Employees International Union of California
 Editorial board of The Globe and Mail Editorial board of the Santa Barbara News-Press Alameda County Democratic Party
 Butte County Democratic Party
 Los Angeles County Democratic Party
 Madera County Democratic Party
 Modoc County Democratic Party
 Monterey County Democratic Party
 Orange County Democratic Party
 Placer County Democratic Party
 Santa Barbara County Democratic Party
 San Francisco County Democratic Party
 San Luis Obispo County Democratic Party
 Siskiyou County Democratic Party
 Sonoma County Democratic Party
 Ventura County Democratic Party
 Democratic Party of the San Fernando Valley
 Orange County Libertarian Party
 Riverside County Libertarian Party
 California Young Democrats
 Progressive Democrats of America
 Republican Liberty Caucus
 Green Party of California
 Peace and Freedom Party
 Libertarian Party of the United States

 Opposition 

 Arnold Schwarzenegger, former Republican Governor of California
 Meg Whitman, 2010 California Republican gubernatorial candidate
 Jerry Brown, current California Governor (2010 California Democratic gubernatorial candidate)
 Dianne Feinstein, current Democratic Senator from California
 Barbara Boxer, current Democratic Senator from California
Carly Fiorina, 2010 California Republican Senatorial candidate
Gil Kerlikowske, current Director of the Office of National Drug Control Policy, and former Seattle police chief
Dan Lungren, current Republican House Representative from California's 3rd congressional district
Nate Holden, former Democratic member of the California State Senate
Gavin Newsom, current California Lieutenant Governor (2010 Democratic candidate for California Lieutenant Governor)
Kamala Harris, current California Attorney General (2010 Democratic candidate for California Attorney General)
 Steve Cooley, current District Attorney of Los Angeles, California and 2010 Republican candidate for California Attorney General
Bonnie Dumanis, current District Attorney of San Diego, California
Leroy D. Baca, current Sheriff of Los Angeles County, California
Sandra Hutchens, current Sheriff of Orange County, California
 Michael J. Rubio, current Democratic Kern County, California supervisor
 Dennis Peron, co-author of California Proposition 215
 Louis R. Miller, current chairman of D.A.R.E. America
 John Redman, current executive director of Californians for Drug Free Youth
 Randy Thomasson, founder of Campaign for Children and Families and supporter of California Proposition 8
 National Organization of Black Law Enforcement Executives
 California Chamber of Commerce 
 League of California Cities
 California State Association of Counties
 California Narcotics Officers Association
 California Police Chiefs Association
 California Association of Highway Patrolmen
 California State Sheriff's Association
 California District Attorneys Association
 California Bus Association
 Association of California School Administrators
 California Beer and Beverage Distributors
 California Cannabis Association
 Bishop, Dr. Ron Allen  California. Founder/President/CEO International Faith Based Coalition.
 Mothers Against Drunk Driving
 National Black Churches Initiative
 Community Anti-Drug Coalitions of America
 The Heritage Foundation
 Editorial board of the San Francisco Chronicle Editorial board of the Sacramento Bee Editorial board of the Los Angeles Times Editorial board of the San Jose Mercury News Editorial board of the San Diego Union-Tribune''

Polling history 

Color indicates the simple majority in a poll.

Polling differences by poll type 

Analysis of different polling techniques showed significant differentials in support for Proposition 19. Polls conducted by a live interviewer showed substantially less support for Proposition 19 than automated polls. It was suggested that there was a "social desirability bias" causing people to deny their support for Proposition 19 to live interviewers.

Another discrepancy was noted in the Action News/SurveyUSA poll taken in late October. Those interviewed via landlines opposed the initiative 53% to 43%, while those on cell phones supported it 54% to 29%.

Outcome

Results by major county

See also 

 California Proposition 215 (1996)
 California Proposition 36 (2000)
 California state elections, November 2010
 Cannabis in California
 Drug policy of California
 Legal history of cannabis in the United States
 Legality of cannabis
 Removal of cannabis from Schedule I of the Controlled Substances Act

References

External links 

 The Full Text of the Regulate, Control and Tax Cannabis Act of 2010
 State of California Legislative Analysts Analysis of the Initiative
 Ballotpedia page on California Proposition 19
 YES on Proposition 19 - the sponsors of the proposal
 Marijuana Policy Project, California branch - a lobbying group in support
 Public Safety First - a lobbying group in opposition

19
Cannabis ballot measures in the United States
Initiatives in the United States
Proposition 19